Polsgrove is an unincorporated community in Carroll County, Illinois, United States.

References

Unincorporated communities in Carroll County, Illinois
Unincorporated communities in Illinois